The Royal Group, based in Phnom Penh, is Cambodia's largest diversified conglomerate and holding company with investments in various industries in the country including telecommunication, media, banking, insurance, resorts, education, property, trading and agriculture.

History
Royal Group Cambodia Co Ltd was established as a general trading company operating out of Australia in 1989. It was incorporated in Cambodia in 1990. In the nineties, the company created strong links with the UNTAC. It became the sole distributor of Canon products and Bell Helicopter in Cambodia, and obtained the distribution of Motorola products in the country. MobiTel (mobile) anBank]] was established through a partnership with Australia and New Zealand Banking Group. The Royal Group got exclusive rights for HBO, Cinemax and the Disney Channels in Cambodia. A joint venture with QSR Brands, which operates KFC and Pizza Hut restaurants all across Asia, brought the first international fastfood chain to Cambodia. Infinity Insurance was established.

In 2008, the Royal Group was granted à 99-year concession to develop Koh Rong island. In 2016, the local authorities ordered to stop the construction of the port because the Royal Group did not have the proper permits to operate. In January 2016, the same happened with a jetty at O'Tres Beach in Koh Rong.

Investment
 Telecommunications and information technologies: CamGSM (Cambodia's leading mobile telecommunications network), NETi Solutions (I.T. software and business consulting services), MobiTel (formerly a joint venture between The Royal Group and Millicom International Cellular, is now wholly owned by The Royal Group following an acquisition in November 2009), Royal Telecam International (second licensed international gateway in the Kingdom, carrying the majority of all international voice traffic, also a former joint venture with Millicom, now wholly owned by the Royal Group), TeleSURF (Cambodia's first broadband service), Ezecom (Internet provider).
 Finance: Infinity Financial Solutions (Cambodian insurance provider backed by Swiss Re), ANZ Royal Bank, Royal Financial Consultancy (RFC, Forex-based consultancy), Camlife (life insurance)
 Education: Southbridge International School Cambodia
 Automotive: Premium Auto Imports Co. Ltd. (exclusive importer of BMW cars), Royal Cambodia Limousine Services (limousine services)
 Media: Cambodian Broadcasting Service (Cambodia's largest television network), CEPCO (Cambodian TV distributor with exclusive rights to HBO, Cinemax and the Disney Channels),  Bamboo Media (Cambodian media and advertising agency), BrandSolutions (advertising, media and marketing services agency), Rock Production (media production house with a recording studio), Rock Entertainment Centre (largest entertainment center in Phnom Penh), One TV
 Hotels and resorts: Royal Park Resort (Siem Reap), Titan King Casino & Resort, Hotel Cambodiana (Phnom Penh's waterfront)
 Property development: Royal Tower (36 floors, 65,000 m2), Koh Rong Island Resort (ecologically sustainable Cambodian island resort), Northbridge Communities, Embassy Place (serviced apartments) 
 Transports: Royal Railway (30-year concession to operate rail services in Cambodia)

References

External links 
 

Investment companies of Cambodia